Statue of Christopher Columbus was installed at Christopher Columbus Park in Trenton, New Jersey, United States. The memorial was removed in July 2020.

See also
 List of monuments and memorials removed during the George Floyd protests

References

Buildings and structures in Trenton, New Jersey
Monuments and memorials in New Jersey
Monuments and memorials to Christopher Columbus
Sculptures of men in New Jersey
Statues in New Jersey
Trenton, New Jersey
Outdoor sculptures in New Jersey
Statues removed in 2020